The 2007 Novilon Internationale Damesronde van Drenthe (2007 Novilon international women's tour of Drenthe) was the 9th running of the Damesronde van Drenthe, a women's bicycle race in Drenthe, the Netherlands. It was rated by the UCI as a 1.1 category race.

Results

s.t. = same time
Sources

References

External links
  

Ronde van Drenthe (women's race)
Novilon Internationale Damesronde van Drenthe
Novilon Internationale Damesronde van Drenthe